Vertigo is a form of dizziness.

Vertigo may also refer to:

 Acrophobia, the fear of heights, often incorrectly called "vertigo"

Arts and entertainment

Amusement parks and rides
 VertiGo (ride), a defunct amusement ride at Cedar Point and Knott's Berry Farm, US
 Vertigo, a ride at Oakwood Theme Park, Wales
 Vertigo, a looping plane ride at Tivoli, Denmark

Fictional entities
 Vertigo (Marvel Comics), two Marvel Comics villains with similar powers
 Count Vertigo, a DC Comics supervillain
 Vertigo, a character in Primal Rage

Film
 Dizziness (film), a 1946 Mexican film with the original title Vértigo
 Vertigo (film), a 1958 film by Alfred Hitchcock
 Vertigo (film score), its soundtrack
 Vertigo effect, or Dolly zoom, a special effect in film, named after the movie

Publications
 Vertigo Comics, a DC Comics imprint
 Vertigo (Sebald novel), a 1990 novel by W. G. Sebald
 Vertigo (UTS), a student newspaper at the University of Technology, Sydney
 Vertigo (wordless novel), a 1937 wordless novel by Lynd Ward

Plays
 Vertigo (play), a 1997 play by Sean O'Connor (producer) based on the same source as the Hitchcock film
 Vértigo, a play by Gastón Suárez

Television 
 Vértigo (TV series), a Mexican telenovela
 "Vertigo" (The Best Years episode), an episode of The Best Years
 "Vertigo" (Arrow), an episode of Arrow
 "Vertigo", an episode of Code Lyoko

Music
 Invertigo (2000–03), an Australian hard rock band named Vertigo (1996–99)
 Le Vertigo, a rondeau for harpsichord by Joseph-Nicolas-Pancrace Royer (1703-55)

Albums
 Vertigo (Billie Myers album), 2000
 Vertigo (Boxcar album), 1990
 Vertigo (Chris Potter album), 1998
 Vertigo (Eden album), 2018
 Vértigo (Fey album), 2002
 Vertigo (Groove Armada album), 1999
 Vertigo (Jackie McLean album), 1980
 Vertigo (Jesse Cook album)
 Vertigo (John 5 album)
 Vertigo (Jump, Little Children album)
 Vértigo (La Ley album), La Ley's fifth album
 Vertigo (The Necks album), 2015
 Vértigo (Pablo Alborán album), 2020
 Vertigo (Zakk Sabbath album), 2020

Songs
 "Vertigo" (Olivia Lewis song), the Maltese entry to the Eurovision Song Contest 2007
 "Vertigo" (U2 song), a 2004 song by U2
 Vertigo Tour, U2's international tour from 2005 to 2006
 Vertigo 2005: Live from Chicago, a DVD of a U2 concert
 "Vertigo/Relight My Fire", 1979 disco song by Dan Hartman and Loleatta Holloway
 "Vertigo", by American Hi-Fi from the American Pie 2 soundtrack
 "Vertigo", by The Libertines from Up the Bracket
 "Vertigo", by Monster Magnet from Dopes to Infinity
 "Vertigo", by Planet Us
 "Vertigo", by Aztec Camera from the album Dreamland
 "Vertigo", by Sarah Slean from the album Day One
 "Vertigo", by Matthew Sweet from the album Earth
 "Vertigo (Do the Demolition)", by Duran Duran from the album Notorious
 "Vertigo", by FM Belfast
 "Vertigo", by Swedish rock band Eclipse from their 2017 album Monumentum
 "Vertigo", by Dutch electro-pop singer Thomas Azier from his 2018 album Stray
 "Vertigo", by American post-metal band Deafheaven from their 2013 album Sunbather
 "Vertigo", by Canadian pop-punk band Marianas Trench from their 2006 album Fix Me

Other arts and entertainment
 Vertigo (dance company), an Israeli dance company
 Vertigo, a stunt performed by David Blaine
 Vertigo, a defunct nightclub on the University of Victoria campus
 Vertigo 42, a champagne bar in Tower 42 in London
 de_vertigo, a gaming map in the Valve game Counter-Strike: Global Offensive and Counter-Strike 1.6, situated on a 51-story skyscraper

Organisations
 Vertigo Entertainment, an American film production company created by Roy Lee
 Vertigo Films, a British film production and film distribution company
 Vertigo Records, a UK-based record label

Other uses
 Vertigo (gastropod), a genus of minute land snails
 Vertigo, the 5th century ascetic practice of standing on towers; See Stylite
 Vertigo, an automobile by Gillet
 Seedwings Europe Vertigo, an Austrian hang glider design of the mid-2000s
 Vertigo, a discontinued lollipop produced by Topps that consisted of one half chocolate, one half hard candy

See also
 O Vertigo!, a 2014 album by Kate Miller-Heidke